Catherine Anne Money  ( Menzies; born 18 August 1940) is an Australian biochemist whose discoveries have changed leather making. By introducing a freezing process, she simplified the preparation of hides in Australian tanneries. Her simplified approach which minimise tannery effluents and maximises hide quality is now used globally.

Early life and schooling
Catherine Money (née Menzies) was born in Melbourne, Victoria to Sir Douglas Menzies, Justice of the High Court of Australia, and Helen Jean Borland, a community worker and kindergarten teacher, in 1940.

Money grew up in Balwyn and attended Preshil (1943–1945) and Fintona Girl's School (1945–1957), in Kew and Balwyn, respectively. Money spent time in isolation with scarlet fever at the Fairfield Infectious Diseases Hospital.

University
Money graduated with a Bachelor of Science from the University of Melbourne in 1960 with an Exhibition in Biochemistry. Thanks to a scholarship, she began a Masters of Science program, specialising in biochemistry, at the University of Melbourne which she completed in 1963. Her thesis, titled: "Studies on the Thyroid Gland", was supervised by Professor Victor Trikojus.

She was a postgraduate research student engaged in research for a PhD at St Bartholomew's Hospital Medical College, London, where she worked with Professor Eric M. Crook on immobilised enzymes. On her mother taking ill, Money returned to Australia and sought work at CSIRO.

CSIRO
Back in Australia, Money applied to work at the CSIRO. The only job available was as an Experimental Officer in the CSIRO Division of Protein Chemistry - working with hides and leather.

Until this time, the standard method for removing hair in the preparation of hides involved the extraction of a pulp, which has been described as "an intensive effluent system."

Money and a fellow scientist discovered that freezing hides prior to tanning aided in the gentle removal of hair, without the use of toxic chemicals.

The process does not damage the animal skins. The freezing preparation of hides is used by leather producers who supply to Louis Vuitton, Gucci, Prada, BMW, Nike and Adidas.

By removing the waste pulp whole, which is rich in nitrogen and phosphorus - it becomes its own product, sold as an ingredient for composting or fertiliser pellets.

Retirement
Money retired from CSIRO in 2005 following closure of its Leather Research Centre. She established her own company, Catherine Money Consulting, specialising in the leather industry and environment. She continued to manage an extension of the Australian Centre for International Agricultural Research (ACIR) Project, Salinity Reduction in Tannery Effluents in India and Australia.

Awards
 1991: John Arthur Wilson Memorial Lecturer – presented to the American Leather Chemists Association; lecture title: "Tannery Waste Minimisation"
 1995: Procter Memorial Lecture – presented to the Society of Leather Technologists and Chemists in the UK; lecture title: "Unhairing and Dewooling – Requirements for Quality and the Environment", British Section of the International Society of Leather Trades
 1998: Public Service Medal – for services to the leather industry

See also
 Timeline of women in science

References

1940 births
Living people
Australian biochemists
University of Melbourne alumni
Scientists from Melbourne
Recipients of the Public Service Medal (Australia)
People from Balwyn, Victoria